Wallace Gichere (1955? – April 26, 2008) was a Kenyan photojournalist and social activist.

In 1991, Gichere was thrown by police out a three-story window in his house in Buru Buru, Nairobi, during a crackdown on the Kanu regime, an event which left Gichere paralysed for life. He needed to use a wheelchair and had no way of earning an income, so he fought for compensation from the Kenyan government for almost a decade, including staging a hunger strike at the Attorney-General's chambers for several days and nights; however, no government official heeded his plight.

Gichere died on April 26, 2008 at the Kenyatta National Hospital, where he had been admitted for two weeks.

References

1950s births
2008 deaths
Kenyan journalists
Victims of police brutality
20th-century journalists